Edmund Grey or Gray is the name of:

Edmund Grey (MP for Lynn) (died 1547), MP for Lynn
Edmund Grey (All My Children), fictional television character in U.S. soap opera, All My Children
Edmund Grey, 1st Earl of Kent (1416–1490), English nobleman
Edmund Dwyer Gray (1845–1888), Home Rule League MP in the Parliament of the United Kingdom and newspaper proprietor
Edmund Dwyer-Gray (1870–1945), his son, also a politician and newspaper proprietor, who became Premier of Tasmania
Edmund Gray (1878–1964), Australian politician

See also
Edward Gray (disambiguation)
Edward Grey (disambiguation)